Tayi Tibble (born 1995) is a New Zealand poet. Her poetry reflects Māori culture and her own family history. Her first collection of poetry, Poūkahangatus (2018), received the Jessie Mackay Prize for Poetry at the 2019 Ockham New Zealand Book Awards, and was published in the United States and the United Kingdom in 2022. Her second collection, Rangikura, was published in 2021.

Life and career
Tibble was born in Wellington in 1995, and grew up in Porirua. She is the oldest of seven children and decided she wanted to become a writer at age 8. She descends from the iwi (tribes) of Ngāti Porou and Te Whānau-ā-Apanui. She has an undergraduate degree in history.

Poūkahangatus
Tibble completed a Masters in Creative Writing at the International Institute of Modern Letters (based at Victoria University of Wellington) in 2017, and received the Adam Foundation Prize in Creative Writing for her work In a Fish Tank Filled with Pink Light. That work subsequently became her first collection, Poūkahangatus, which was published in 2018 by Victoria University Press. It received the Jessie Mackay Prize for Poetry (the best first poetry book award) at the 2019 Ockham New Zealand Book Awards. Anahera Gildea, reviewing the collection for Landfall, described her poetry as a "'a new kind of beauty' that employs clever image piling techniques, layering of ideas, registers and codes, and enables her to emerge as a new voice requiring the reader to look at all things afresh", and the collection as "surely the breakthrough collection of the year, if not the decade".

In July 2022 Poūkahangatus was published in the United States by Knopf, and in the United Kingdom by Penguin Books. In November 2022 it was named by The New Yorker as one of the best books of 2022 so far. The New York Times commented:

Rangikura
Tibble's second collection, Rangikura, was published in 2021. The poems are based in part on her own experiences growing up as a young Māori women, and many of the poems were written during the 2020 COVID-19 lockdown. She describes the book as being more personal than her first book, and as "pay[ing] tribute to modern Māori culture by using the humour, sexuality and friendship that encapsulates my generation". Reviewer Hamesh Wyatt, writing for the Otago Daily Times, described it as a "fiery new work" and an "immersive trip". Paula Green said in her review:

In March 2022, Rangikura was shortlisted for the Mary and Peter Biggs Award for Poetry at the Ockham New Zealand Book Awards.

Other work
Tibble's work has been published in Pantograph Punch, The Spinoff, The Wireless, Sport and the anthology The Friday Poem: 100 New Zealand Poems (edited by Steve Braunias). In 2018 she read her poem "Hoki Mai" at an Anzac Day parade attended by 25,000 people in Wellington. In 2019 she joined Pantograph Punch as a staff writer.  she also works as a publicity assistant for Victoria University Press and as an astrologist for Metro magazine. She has previously worked at Toi Māori Aotearoa. In 2021 she appeared in the music video for Lorde's single Solar Power. Her poems were included in the show UPU presented at the Silo Theatre as part of the Auckland Arts Festival in 2020, and at the Kia Mau Festival in 2021.

In May 2022 Tibble headlined two events at the PEN World Voices festival on international and indigenous poetry.

References

External links 
 "Hoki Mai", poem by Tibble, in The Spinoff
 "Watching the Boys Play Rugby", poem by Tibble, in the Summer 2018 issue of New Zealand Review of Books
 "Identity Politics", poem by Tibble, in the 2018 issue of Ōrongohau | Best New Zealand Poems
 "My visit to Ihumātao as an urban Māori millennial", essay by Tibble

1995 births
Living people
21st-century New Zealand poets
21st-century New Zealand women writers
People from Wellington City
International Institute of Modern Letters alumni
New Zealand Māori writers
Te Whānau-ā-Apanui people
Ngāti Porou people